DXED (1224 AM) Radyo Agila is a radio station owned and operated by the Eagle Broadcasting Corporation. The station's studio and transmitter are located at Purok Maharlika, Lourdes Sinangcote Village II, Brgy. Magumpo East, Tagum.

The station was formerly located along P. Cabaguio Ave., Agdao, Davao City from its inception on March 7, 1988, to September 27, 2020, when it relocated to its present home in Tagum. It was relaunched last October 26, 2020.

References

DXED
News and talk radio stations in the Philippines
Radio stations established in 1988
Iglesia ni Cristo